Cutkosky is a surname. Notable people with the surname include:

Ethan Cutkosky (born 1999), American actor and singer
Richard E. Cutkosky (1928–1993), American physicist